Kazanka is a rural locality (a selo) and the administrative center of Kazansky Selsoviet, Alsheyevsky District, Bashkortostan, Russia. The population was 350 as of 2010. There are 2 streets.

Geography 
Kazanka is located 15 km northwest of Rayevsky (the district's administrative centre) by road. Fan is the nearest rural locality.

References 

Rural localities in Alsheyevsky District